Vaishali Samant is an Indian playback singer, music composer, lyricist  who is popularly known for her work in the Hindi and Marathi films as wel as independent music albums like 
 AIKA DAJIBA.
Sung fr music director AR reheman, Avdhoot gupte.,Ajay-atul  and many more  
  sung in Bengali, Gujarati, Bhojpuri, Assamese, Tamil and Telugu languages.
As a composer  hascomposed for 8 marathi films and many singles
She is the 4rth female music compser for whom adaraaniya Lata Mangeshkarji has sung.

Career
She has sung for music composers like A. R. Rahman in Lagaan, Taal and Saathiya. She has also sung for bollywood films like Padmashree Laloo Prasad Yadav, Girlfriend, Eight, Malamaal Weekly, Tujhe Meri Kasam, Chetna, Dil Jo Bhi Kahe, Traffic Signal, Chamku, Mirch. Her most well known song is Chalka Re from Saathiya by A. R. Rahman. She was nominated for the Favorite Artist, India at the MTV Asia music awards in 2004. She was nominated for Gadbad Gondhal in Ambarnath Marathi Film Festival in 2017 as Best Singer (Female).,

Playback singing

References

 http://www.indiantelevision.com/release/y2k9/june/junerel19.php
 https://web.archive.org/web/20130307150446/http://www.orissadiary.com/ShowEntertainmentNews.asp?id=18026
 http://www.planetradiocity.com/musicopedia/music_newupdatearticle.php?conid=1224
 http://timesofindia.indiatimes.com/entertainment/marathi/music/Vaishali-Samant-all-set-to-sing-Hindi-songs/articleshow/53286290.cms
 http://timesofindia.indiatimes.com/entertainment/hindi/music/news/Vaishali-Samant-The-original-Chikni-singer/articleshow/11565236.cms

External links
 

Living people
Indian women playback singers
Marathi playback singers
Bollywood playback singers
Indian women composers
Indian women singer-songwriters
Indian singer-songwriters
Marathi people
Singers from Pune
Kannada playback singers
Tamil playback singers
21st-century Indian singers
21st-century Indian women musicians
21st-century Indian women singers
21st-century Indian composers
Women musicians from Maharashtra
21st-century women composers
1977 births